Ferry Street Bridge may refer to:

Ferry Street-Thorofare Canal Bridge, Grosse Ile, Michigan, listed on the National Register of Historic Places (NRHP)
Anoka–Champlin Mississippi River Bridge, Champlin and Anoka, Minnesota, also known as Ferry Street Bridge, NRHP-listed
Ferry Street Bridge (Eugene, Oregon), NRHP-listed
Ferry Street Bridge (Connecticut), see List_of_movable_bridges_in_Connecticut
Ferry Street Bridge (Buffalo), see Black Rock Canal